The Anti-Secession Law is a law of the People's Republic of China, passed by the 3rd Session of the 10th National People's Congress. It was ratified on March 14, 2005, and went into effect immediately. President Hu Jintao promulgated the law with Presidential Decree No. 34. Although the law, at ten articles, is relatively short, Article 8 formalized the long-standing policy of the PRC to use military means against Taiwan independence in the event peaceful means become otherwise impossible. The law does not explicitly equate "China" with the People's Republic of China (referred to in the law as "the State").

The Anti-Secession Law is the only law passed by the National People's Congress that has neither the prefix "People's Republic of China" nor "Decision/Resolution of the Standing Committee of the National People's Congress."

Background 

Taiwan was formally incorporated into the Qing dynasty in 1683. After the First Sino-Japanese War, it was ceded by the Qing to the Empire of Japan in perpetuity in 1895. At the end of World War II, it was surrendered by Japan to the Kuomintang (KMT) administration of the Republic of China. After the establishment of the People's Republic of China in 1949, Taiwan and some neighboring islands continued to be controlled by the Republic of China government. In 1952, the Treaty of Taipei nullified all treaties, conventions and agreements previously concluded between China and Japan before December 9, 1941. Currently, the People's Republic of China (PRC) government considers Taiwan to be a province of China. According to the PRC, it is the sole legitimate government of China, and the government of the Republic of China ceased to hold sovereignty over China when it lost control of the Chinese mainland following the Chinese Civil War. It argues that the PRC assumed sovereignty over the entirety of China in 1949–1950, including Taiwan, although the latter remained under the administration of the Republic of China government.

The official Republic of China (ROC) view is that it did not cease to exist in 1949 and has continued to function as a sovereign political entity in Taiwan to the present day, making the relationship between the PRC and ROC similar to that between other partitioned states (such as North Korea and South Korea). Official recognition by most international organizations (such at the United Nations and World Health Organization) rests largely with the PRC. in 1992, the "One-China policy" was agreed between the governments of both sides whereby each would assert that there was only 'one China' although disagreed about which side was the legitimate government of it. However, some advocates of Taiwan independence oppose both the PRC's and the ROC's claim to Taiwan and the legality of the Chinese sovereignty over Taiwan.

Multiple opinion polls conducted in Taiwan have indicated that there is very little support for immediate unification on the PRC's terms or for an immediate declaration of independence. Polls have also consistently shown that a large majority of Taiwanese would support discussion of unification only if the economic and political systems of the two sides were comparable. A majority of Taiwan residents appear to support the "status quo" but there are different opinions in Taiwanese society, within the PRC, and within the international community, over what the status quo is. A full 74 percent of the Taiwanese public agree that "Taiwan is an independent sovereign country"

The re-election of Chen Shui-bian to the ROC Presidency, led many to conclude that there has been an increase in Taiwan independence sentiment and that a new Taiwanese identity is emerging on the island which is opposed to identification with China. During the 2004 ROC Legislative Election, the strategy of the pan-Green coalition was to try to capitalize on this trend to win a majority in the Legislative Yuan of Taiwan. Among some Taiwanese Independence supporters, it is believed that a pan-green majority could force a crucial referendum for constitutional reform and, perhaps, to further move the island toward de jure independence. Many Taiwanese independence supporters, including former President Lee Teng-Hui, argued that Taiwan should declare independence before 2008 on the theory that international pressure over the Beijing Olympics would prevent the PRC from using force against Taiwan.

These events in late 2004 caused a great deal of alarm in Beijing.  Observers indicated that many in Beijing believed that its policies toward Taiwan had failed both because it did not have sufficient incentives to gain Taiwanese public support for unification and at the same time, it seemed that many in Taiwan did not take Beijing's stated threats of force seriously. The ROC government had defined the status quo in such a way that a de jure declaration of independence could be argued to not represent a change in the status quo. Some Chinese believe these events led to the formulation in 2003 and 2004 of the Anti-Secession Law.

In early 2004 a similar proposed law had been tabled. Titled the National Unification Promotion Law of the People's Republic of China, it was authored by a Chinese academic Yu Yuanzhou (余元洲), a professor from Jianghan University in Wuhan who did not hold any formal governmental position, as a suggestion to create a formal legal basis for the People's Republic of China's unification with Taiwan. Although no formal legislative action was taken on the document, the heavy debate surrounding it, and the suggestion that some sort of anti-secession law would be passed, was viewed by many in Taiwan as evidence of hostile intent by the PRC government towards Taiwan independence supporters.

In the December 2004 ROC Legislative elections, although the ruling DPP party increased its share of votes in the legislature and remained the largest single party there, the pan-blue coalition gained a razor-thin majority, which surprised many. However, this result may have been less a reflection of popular sentiment than a testament to the effectiveness of the KMT's more frugal nomination of candidates (116) compared with the DPP's over-nomination of candidates (122) and the KMT's rigid party rules for allotment of votes to its candidates within individual districts.  This election result ended most prospects of an immediate declaration of independence and also called into question whether there really had been an increase in Taiwanese independence sentiment.  Despite this, the PRC proceeded with the drafting of the anti-secession law.  The main reasons given to foreign interlocutors were that the PRC leadership believed that its Taiwan policy in the past had been reactive rather than proactive and that it was necessary for the PRC to show initiative.  Furthermore, Beijing expressed a residual distrust of Chen Shui-bian.  Many foreign experts have argued that the PRC's decision-making system was rigid and that plans put into place to deal with a pan-green victory had simply developed too much momentum to be shut down.

In announcing the drafting of the law in December 2004, the Head of the Legal Affairs Committee of the Standing Committee of the National People's Congress mentioned explicitly that the law was not intended to be applied to Hong Kong and Macau.

Content
The Law is composed of ten articles. Articles one to five are aspirational. Articles six to nine set out in general terms the procedures for promoting cross-strait relations, negotiation, and resolution of the issue. Article ten sets the date of operation.

Article one states that the aim of the law is to prevent "Taiwan's secession from China" and promote unification. Stabilizing the Taiwan Straits area and protecting the interests of the Zhonghua Minzu are also purposes of the law.

Articles two to four outline the PRC government's view of the present political status of Taiwan. This view is that mainland China and Taiwan belong to one China, that there is only one China and that the sovereignty of that one China is indivisible; the "Taiwan issue" is a residual problem of the Chinese Civil War and is an internal affair of China.

Article five maintains that the one China principle is the basis for resolution of the issue and that the State must seek all possibilities of "peaceful reunification." The same section also states that, following "peaceful reunification," Taiwan will enjoy a high level of autonomy and operate under a system different from mainland China. Although this would appear to be similar to the "one country, two systems" scheme, highly unpopular in Taiwan, it is not so named.

Article six deals with cross-strait relations. It states that in order to maintain peace and stability in the Taiwan straits and to foster cross-strait relations, the State should
encourage people-to-people contact to foster closer relations and understanding
encourage cross-strait economic exchanges
encourage scientific and cultural exchanges
joint efforts to fight crime and
encourage efforts to maintain peace and stability in the Taiwan straits.

Article seven deals with cross-strait negotiation. It states that the State shall support negotiations and consultations on both sides of the straits with equal status, with different modalities, and in differing stages. The topics of such talks can include 
ending the states of hostilities across the straits
 developing rules for cross strait relations
 the means of promoting unification 
 the political status of the Taiwanese authorities
appropriate means by which Taiwan can participate in international organizations, and
 any other issues relating to unification.

Article eight deals with non-peaceful action, and is the article which has caused the most controversy and attention. It states that the State shall use non-peaceful and other necessary means under these alternative conditions:
if "Taiwan independence" forces, under whatever name and method, accomplish the fact of Taiwan's separation from China,
or if a major event occurs which would lead to Taiwan's separation from China,
or if all possibility of peaceful unification is lost.

Article nine states that in the planning and implementation of "non-peaceful and other necessary actions", the State must, as much as possible, act to protect the persons and property of Taiwanese civilians and foreigners in Taiwan, and to minimise their losses. The State must also protect Taiwanese interests in the PRC.

Development 
In December 2004, the PRC state news agency Xinhua reported that the National People's Congress in its upcoming session would enact an 'anti-secession law', without specifying further details.

In a rare moment of agreement, politicians in Taiwan from both the Pan-green coalition and Pan-blue coalition reacted negatively towards this development. Some politicians have proposed that the ROC enact an 'anti-annexation law' to counter the proposed PRC law. Various opinion polls have revealed that 80% of Taiwan residents oppose such an 'anti-secession law' and a majority agree that a defensive referendum should be held in the advance of such a law to protect the status quo.

President Chen Shui-bian commented on the 'anti-secession law' during his 2005 new year speech: "Such actions will not only unilaterally change the status quo of peace in the Taiwan Strait, but will also pose the greatest threat to regional stability and world peace." Whereas the PRC Paramount leader Hu Jintao said "We will definitely not allow anyone to separate Taiwan from China by any means," in his New Year's Eve speech.

Although the PRC's official English translation of the law is the Anti-Secession Law, the Mainland Affairs Council in Taiwan has consistently translated it as Anti-Separation Law as secession implies that Taiwan is a part of the PRC. The Mainland Affairs Council and the ROC government has argued that the relationship across the Taiwan Strait is not analogous to the situation during the American Civil War since Taiwan was never part of the PRC.

Early reaction 
Beijing claims that this bill is the PRC's most sincere attempt at resolving the Taiwan issue peacefully (see Political status of Taiwan). However, Taipei points to Article 8 as cause for concern. Shortly after the bill was passed, President Chen Shui-bian called for a National Security meeting in Taipei to discuss the issue.

One major topic of controversy between Beijing and Taipei is to what degree the law changes the status quo in the Taiwan Straits.  Beijing has maintained that the law preserves the status quo and creates no new conditions for the use of force.  In contrast, Taipei has argued that the law does change the status quo and gives the People's Liberation Army a "blank check" to attack Taiwan.

Prior to the passage of the bill, a statement from Taipei's Mainland Affairs Council and a resolution overwhelmingly passed by the ROC legislature stated that the status quo is that the Republic of China is sovereign and independent. The statement and resolution were carefully worded to avoid disagreements between the pan-blue and pan-green coalition over whether the Republic of China has any residual sovereignty over Mainland China.

After the law was passed, a Mainland Affairs Council official referred to Beijing's definition of "one China" in the PRC law as fiction.

Reaction in mainland China 
Reaction within the PRC was mostly consistent. State media and the Beijing leadership all stood firmly behind the new law and vowed never to allow anyone, using any means, to "separate Taiwan from China", in any name. The National People's Congress voted unanimously in favor of the law, with two abstentions. In the run-up to the law's ratification, state media in the PRC accused those in Taiwan in favour of Taiwan independence of creating hostility to the new law and of confusing the Taiwanese into thinking that the law had hostile intent. Prior to passing the law, Chinese Communist Party (CCP) general secretary Hu Jintao in a speech outlined a four-point guideline to resolving the issue.

Reaction in Hong Kong
At the time the unification law was proposed by legal scholar Yu Yuanzhou, the press in Hong Kong expressed concern that it would lead to legislation by stealth of the anti-treason or anti-secession provision of the Basic Law Article 23 legislation in 2003. These concerns were addressed when a mainland China official stated explicitly the law would not be added to Annex III of the Basic Law, which means that it would not be applicable to Hong Kong.  After the passage of the law in March 2005, there was very little reaction in Hong Kong and news of the law was far overshadowed by the resignation of Hong Kong's chief executive, Tung Chee-Hwa. In the 15 years since the law was passed, it has cast a long shadow over Hong Kong.

Reaction in Taiwan

In Taiwan, the passage of the law was condemned by officials and politicians from both the Pan-Green Coalition and the Pan-Blue Coalition, although there were differences in the content of their criticism.  Supporters of the Pan-Green Coalition tended to react angrily to the spirit and content of the law as an infringement of what they saw as Taiwanese sovereignty. By contrast, supporters of the Pan-Blue Coalition, while stating that they opposed the law and the threat of force against Taiwan, called for more dialogue with the PRC and pointed to parts of the law in which Beijing showed hitherto unseen flexibility.

Opinion polls indicated widespread opposition to the law among the general public. Some questioned whether Beijing had the authority to enact such a law as they claim that Taiwan is not under the PRC jurisdiction (See Political status of Taiwan). The Pan-Green Coalition, in particular, reacted with distaste and there have been calls for an "anti-annexation law" to be passed by the legislature. Premier Frank Hsieh pointed out that the PRC law had already infringed on ROC sovereignty and thus met the criteria for initiating a "defensive referendum" under the ROC constitution. However, he added that whether a defensive referendum would be invoked is at the discretion of the ROC president.

A protest march against the PRC law took place on March 26 and it was widely reported that one million Taiwanese participated in the protest. Both the former President Lee Teng-hui and President Chen Shui-bian joined the march. However, Chen Shui-bian announced in advance that he would only attend the march and wouldn't be giving a speech. Most politicians from the Pan-Blue Coalition did not participate in any protest march, although they claimed that they would not dissuade their supporters from attending if they wished. The turnout of the march became a subject of political debate in Taiwan, with the mayor of Taipei city, Ma Ying-jeou, downplaying the participant number to around 270,000, while the march organizers claimed that the goal of one million participants was reached.

On March 25, 2008, DPP legislators tabled a bill titled the "Anti-Annexation Peace Law" at the procedural committee level in the legislature, which would have stated that "Taiwan and China are not subordinate to each other"; that "Taiwan is a sovereign state"; and that "the relationship between Taiwan and China is one between two states". It would have expressed hope that the Taiwan issue be resolved peacefully, but that if the status quo of the Taiwan Strait should change, the President would have the power to deal non-peacefully with "China's annexation". The bill was rejected at the procedural committee level by a vote of 11:2 and was not presented to the legislature.

International responses
United States Secretary of State Condoleezza Rice commented that the law was "not necessary", while White House spokesman Scott McClellan called its adoption "unfortunate", adding "It does not serve the purpose of peace and stability in the Taiwan Strait". In speaking about the law, the United States repeated that it remained supportive of the One China policy as the US defines it, that it did not support Taiwan independence, and opposed any unilateral action to change the status quo. The United States House of Representatives approved a resolution criticizing the PRC for the approval of the PRC law in Beijing. The resolution expressed grave concern about the law and said the PRC law provides a legal justification for PRC to use force against Taiwan, in its words, altering the status quo in the region.

In response to the enactment of the PRC law, the European Union issued a statement urging "all sides to avoid any unilateral action that could stoke tensions," and recalled the "constant principles that guide its policy, namely its commitment to the principle of one China and the peaceful resolution of dispute...and its opposition to any use of force." Later, on 14 April 2005, the European Parliament adopted an own-initiative report by Elmar Brok MEP, with paragraph 33 stating:
 [The European Parliament expresses] its deepest concern at the large number of missiles in southern China aimed across the Taiwan Straits and at the so-called "anti-secession law" of the People's Republic of China that in an unjustified way aggravates the situation across the Straits; calls on the People's Republic of China and on the R.O.C. in Taiwan to resume political talks on the basis of mutual understanding and recognition in order to promote stability, democracy, human rights and the rule of law in east Asia.
The EU also decided to continue with the arms embargo, which had been imposed upon the PRC after the Tiananmen Square Massacre and which had been set to expire in 2005.

Japanese Prime Minister Junichiro Koizumi said "I wish both parties would work towards a peaceful resolution and I hope that this law will not have negative effects."

Australian foreign minister Alexander Downer stated that if war were to occur in the Taiwan Straits, Australia would be required under the ANZUS treaty to consult with the United States but depending on the situation that it would not necessarily commit Australia to war.  He said that "we don't think that the PRC should resolve the Taiwan status question militarily, that it has got to be done through negotiations with Taiwan". Downer further commented that Australia would have preferred it had China not passed the anti-secession law.

Several other nations expressed support for the PRC's anti-secession law, including:
 CIS nations: Russia, Belarus, Uzbekistan, Azerbaijan
 Latin American and Caribbean nations: Cuba, Venezuela, and Dominica.
 Asian and Middle Eastern nations: Indonesia, Cambodia, Nepal, Syria, Pakistan, North Korea, Iraq
 African nations: Ethiopia, Comoros
 the former nation of Serbia and Montenegro

See also 

 Chinese unification
 National People's Congress Decision on Hong Kong national security legislation, similar law regarding Hong Kong
 New York Anti-Secession Ordinance, a non-binding New York state resolution characterized in Chinese media as a federal U.S. anti-secession law
 Political status of Taiwan
 Proposed National Unification Promotion Law
 Secession
 "Taiwan, China"
 Taiwan Province
 Taiwan Relations Act
 Taiwan Province, People's Republic of China

References

External links 

 Report of Wen Jiabao on drafting and passing the law
Taiwan News: Reaction in Taiwan
 Full text of the anti-secession law in English
Wikinews:Hundreds of thousands protest anti-secession law in Taiwan
People's Daily: Anti-secession Law will not be applied in Hong Kong and Macau (in Traditional Chinese)
 Xinhua: Anti-secession Law will not be applied in Hong Kong and Macau (in Simplified Chinese)
Legal Malware: Hong Kong’s National Anthem Ordinance by Kevin Carrico for Hong Kong Watch.

Separatism in China
Laws of China
Cross-Strait relations
2005 in law
2005 in China